Don't Mind If I Do is the fifth album by the British new wave band Culture Club, released in 1999 by Virgin Records. The album was released only in Europe and Japan, though some promo copies also circulated in Australia.

Overview
Don't Mind If I Do was Culture Club's first album of new material in 13 years, after the break-up of the band in 1986 and subsequent reformation in 1998. Numerous producers worked on the project, including Culture Club's original producer Steve Levine (who had produced their first three hit albums). However, despite heavy promotion, the album was a commercial failure, only peaking at No.64 in the UK Albums Chart. The album contains the UK Top 10 single, "I Just Wanna Be Loved", which had been released over a year earlier and was originally included on the band's Greatest Moments compilation. Further singles taken from the album included "Your Kisses Are Charity" which reached Number 25 in the UK, while the next single "Cold Shoulder"/"Starman" stalled at Number 43.

Track listing

1: Recorded & Mixed at Roundhouse Recording Studios, London 1999.
2: Recorded and Mixed at Strongroom Studios, 1999.
3: Strongroom Studios, London 1994.
4: Recorded at Konk Studios, Church Studios, London 1999.
5: Recorded at Konk Studios, London 1999.
6: Recorded & Mixed Themis Mobile Studio.
7: Recorded at Konk Studios, Church Studios, London 1999.
8: Recorded at Konk Studios, London 1999.
9: Produced for Man Made Soul Ltd., Recorded & Mixed at Man Made Soul Studio.
10: Recorded at Konk Studios, London 1999.
11: Recorded at Church Studios, Mixed at Konk Studios, London 1999.
13: Recorded & Mixed @ Konk Studios, London 1999.
14: Additional production and Remix for Drum Promotions, programmed for Strongroom Management. Recorded at Konk Studios, Church Studios & Angel Studios, London. Additional recording & remix at home, London 1999.
15: Recorded & Mixed @ Konk Studios, London 1999

Personnel 
Culture Club
 Boy George – vocals
 Mikey Craig – bass guitar, piano, vocal arrangement
 Roy Hay – conductor, guitar, keyboards, vocal arrangements, brass arrangements
 Jon Moss – percussion, drums
Additional musicians

 John Themis – guitar, vocal arrangement
 Tim Cansfield – guitar
 Tony Remy – guitar
 Steve Honest – pedal steel guitar
 Darius Zickus – keyboards, programming
 Kevan Frost – keyboards
 Jonathan Shorten – keyboards
 Sacha Skarbek – keyboards
 Chaz "Da Bat" Kkoshi – Hammond organ
 Richie Stevens – percussion, programming
 Gillian Findlay – violin
 Sophie Langdon – violin
 Julian Leaper – violin
 Roland Roberts – violin
 Paul Wiley – violin
 Rolf Wilson – violin
 Kate Evans – fiddle
 Chris "Snake" Davis – flute, saxophone
 Neil Sidwell – trombone, brass arrangement
 Steve Sidwell – trumpet, flugelhorn, brass
 Paul Spong – trumpet, flugelhorn
 John Thirkell – trumpet
 London Chamber Orchestra – strings
 Robin Smith – arranger, programming, music direction
 Paul Staveley O'Duffy – programming
 Steve Levine – programming
 "Disco Dave" Daniels – programming
 Aidan Love – programming
 David Maurice – programming
 Spencer "Mr. Spee" Graham – programming, backing vocals
 Emily Themis – backing vocals
 Zee Asher – backing vocals
 Angie Brown – backing vocals
 Linda Duggan – backing vocals
 Gina Foster – backing vocals
 Chyna Gordon – backing vocals
 Derek Green – backing vocals
 Mary Pearce – backing vocals
 Paul "Tubbs" Williams – backing vocals
 Derick Johnson – rap

Production personnel
 John Themis – executive producer, music direction
 Paul Staveley O'Duffy – producer, engineer, mixing engineer
 Dominic "Dom T" Thrupp – producer, remixing
 Roy Hay – producer
 Steven Levine – producer
 Jon Musgrave – engineer, mixing engineer
 Chris Scard – engineer, mixing engineer
 Albert Pinheiro – engineer, assistant engineer
 Pete Lewis – engineer
 Frank Arkwright – mastering, cutting engineer
 "Wing Commander Gill" (Daniel Gilliland) – assistant engineer
 Graham Hogg – assistant engineer
 Ian Rossiter – assistant engineer
 Ryan Tully – assistant engineer
 Roland Herrington – mixing engineer
 Richie Stevens – mixing
 Fiesta Mailing – transcription
 Ryan Art – design
 Paul Cox – photography

Release details

References

1999 albums
Culture Club albums
Albums produced by Steve Levine
Virgin Records albums
Albums recorded at The Church Studios